Archduke John is a 1929 Austrian silent historical drama film directed by Max Neufeld and starring Igo Sym, Xenia Desni and Paul Biensfeldt. It portrays the life of Archduke John of Austria, a nineteenth century member of the Habsburg Dynasty.

It was shot at the Schönbrunn Studios in Vienna and on location in Styria. The film's sets were designed by the art director Hans Ledersteger.

Cast
 Igo Sym as Erzherzog Johann
 Xenia Desni as Anna Plochl, Postillon von Aussee
 Paul Biensfeldt as Kaiser Ferdinand I.
 Hans Homma as Fürst Metternich, Staatskanzler
 Werner Pittschau as Graf Ferdinand Prokesch
 Carl Auen as Der Herrnhofbauer
 Max Maximilian as Franz Plochl, K.k.Posthalter Aussee
 Paul Askonas as Graf Arnhorst, Metternichts rechte Hand
 Victor Kutschera as Fürsterzbischof Roncourt
 Fritz Strassny as Der Bader von Aussee

References

Bibliography

External links

1929 films
Austrian silent feature films
Films directed by Max Neufeld
Austrian historical drama films
1920s historical drama films
Films set in Vienna
Films set in the 19th century
Cultural depictions of Klemens von Metternich
Films shot at Schönbrunn Studios
1929 drama films
Films set in the Austrian Empire
Biographical films about Austrian royalty
Silent historical drama films
1920s German-language films